Chaudandigadhi is a municipality in Udayapur District of Province No. 1 in Nepal that was established on 10 March 2017 by merging the former Village development committees Chaudandi, Siddipur, Hadiya and Sundarpur with the former municipality Beltar Basaha. At the time of the 2011 Nepal census, the localities out of which Chaudandigadhi would be formed had a joint population of 48,574 people living in 10,519 individual households.
It is surrounded by Belka Municipality in the east, Triyuga in the west, the districts of Khotang and Bhojpur in the north and Sunsari District in the south.

The Mayor of the municipality is Nirmal kumar Rai and Rita Chaudhari is Deputy Mayor

History
Beltar Bashasa Municipality was established by merging the two Village Development Committee Beltar and Bashasa on 18 May 2014.

In March 2017 some more Village Development Committee were added to the Municipality: Chaudandi, Siddhipur, Hadiya and Sundarpur and the municipality was renamed Chaudandigadhi after the former Village Development Committee Chaudandi.

Demographics

The total population of Chaudandigadhi Municipality is 48,574 in which 22,082 are male and 26,492 are female, living in 10,519 households. 31,023 people can read and write, while only 264 people have graduated. The most spoken language in the municipality is Nepali language which is spoken by 25,035 people. Other languages such as Tharu (7,138), Chamling (3,011), Bantwa (2,780), Magar (2,545), Maithili (1,946) are also spoken. Rai people are mostly inhabited cast in the municipality with 11,814 individuals. Chhetri (11,082), Tharu (7,215), Magar (3,464), Kami (3,070), Bahun (2,305) are also inhabited gradually.

References

 
Municipalities in Koshi Province
Nepal municipalities established in 2014
Municipalities in Udayapur District